Arn Kritsky (born August 25, 1961) is an American weightlifter. He competed at the 1984 Summer Olympics and the 1988 Summer Olympics.

References

External links
 

1961 births
Living people
American male weightlifters
Olympic weightlifters of the United States
Weightlifters at the 1984 Summer Olympics
Weightlifters at the 1988 Summer Olympics
People from Vienna, Virginia
20th-century American people
21st-century American people